Cadmium cyanide is an inorganic compound with the formula Cd(CN)2.  It is a white crystalline compound that is used in electroplating. It is very toxic, along with other cadmium and cyanide compounds.

Preparation and structure
Cadmium cyanide is prepared commercially by treating cadmium hydroxide with hydrogen cyanide:
 Cd(OH)2 + 2 HCN → Cd(CN)2 + 2 H2O
It can also be generated from tetracyanocadmate:
[Cd(CN)4]2−  +  CdCl2  →  2 Cd(CN)2  +  2 Cl−

Cadmium cyanide and zinc cyanide adopt similar structures.  As such, each metal has tetrahedral coordination sphere.  Cyanide ligands interconnect pairs of metal centers.  Two of the resulting diamondoid structures are interpenetrated.  The structure is related to that of cristobalite, a polymorphs of SiO2.  This structural similarity of cadmium dicyanide and cristobalite was foundational in the development of mineralomimetic chemistry: "the build-up of mineral-like structures using materials that never give stable minerals."

Reactions and uses
It is used as an electrolyte for electrodeposition of thin metallic cadmium coatings on metal to protect against corrosion.

Like zinc cyanide, cadmium cyanide is fairly soluble in water, which is unusual for transition metal cyanides.  The solubility increases with the additional cyanide, this reaction proceeding via "[Cd(CN)3]−" and [Cd(CN)4]2−. With acids, its solutions evolve hydrogen cyanide.  When it is crystallizes in the presence of certain small molecules, it forms clathrates.

References

Cadmium compounds
Cyanides